John L. Insprucker (born October 7, 1956) is an American aerospace engineer and retired Air Force colonel currently working at SpaceX as a Principal Integration Engineer. He is honored on the National Air and Space Museum's Wall of Honor.

In 1978, at age 22, Insprucker joined the U.S. Air Force Reserve Officers Training Corps program at the University of Michigan. He spent his entire career dedicated to space launch operations, space rocket development and spacecraft development and deployment, even doing a five-year service between 2000 and 2005 at Vandenberg Air Force Base Space Launch Complex-4, which is currently being leased out to SpaceX.

Career at Vandenberg Air Force Base 
John Insprucker began serving at Vandenberg in 1980 as a pad, payload and rocket technician. During his first five years he helped with the success of 17 Titan NIB and IIID/34D launches and 9 Agena upper stages. He then went to join the Secretary of the Air Force's Special Project Office as head of the Spacecraft Attitude control division. During this time he participated in developing the software used for reconnaissance satellites for the National Reconnaissance Office (NRO), where he was commended for saving a damaged satellite from an Attitude Control System (ACS) failure. Whilst working with the NRO, Insprucker led a 60-person department to manufacture a $2.5 billion NRO Space system. He also served as a program manager for a $700M follow-on satellite. Between 2000 and 2005, he was stationed at Vandenberg Air Force Base where he successfully launched 11 Titan II and Titan IVB rockets first as the deputy program manager from 2000 to 2002, and then as commander of the Titan program from 2003 to 2004. On August 13, 2003, a Titan IVB at Cape Canaveral Launch Complex 40 suffered a nitrogen tetroxide leak caused by faulty fuel pump. Insprucker announced on October 3, 2003, that leak was result of a malfunction with the propellant pump and not an issue related to the Lockheed Martin propellant team. From December 13, 2003, through to November 30, 2005, he led the operation of the Delta IV and Atlas V rockets. During this time, he was the director for the inaugural flight of the Delta IV Heavy, which at the time was the most powerful, active rocket.

Work at SpaceX 
On 27 November 2006, John Insprucker extended his part-time contract at SpaceX to a full-time contract where Elon Musk entrusted him to oversee the development of the Falcon 9. Musk stated that John Insprucker would not be involved with lobbying the US Air Force to purchase flights on SpaceX rockets. John currently holds the position as a Principal Integration Engineer at SpaceX. Insprucker has in the past and continues to occasionally host SpaceX webcasts. John Insprucker mainly hosts webcasts of historic SpaceX launches such as COTS-2 (first private spacecraft to dock to the ISS), First re-flight of a rocket (SES-10), Falcon Heavy Demo Flight, Dragon In-Flight abort test, and Demo-2 (first crewed SpaceX launch), as well as Starship test flights.

According to SpaceX fans, John Insprucker is considered by popular opinion to be the best SpaceX webcast host, receiving high appraisal from space flight reporters and Elon Musk. Fans consider him a great host due to 'being an absolute professional who knows what he's doing.' 'He delivers information in a very steady and comprehensive manner while making far fewer mistakes than other hosts.'

On July 5th 2017, during the webcast for the launch of a GTO satellite, Intelsat 35e, John accidentally said the word "norminal" instead of "nominal".  That word is now in the lexicon of most launch enthusiasts.

On 2nd February 2021, he surprised SpaceX Fans during the Starship SN9 High Altitude Flight Test: testing and streaming took less than 15 minutes, but no one expected a commentary, based on the earlier SN8 test, which was not commented. But shortly after the streaming started, he took over with his voice to explain and comment on the test. Even in that case he showed his great professionalism, despite not being a routine launch but an experimental test. Finally, he involuntarily ironically commented on the "RUD" (Rapid Unscheduled Disassembly) stating: "We just got to work on that landing a little bit...".

Insprucker subsequently hosted the flight tests of SN10 and SN11 in March, and SN15 in May 2021. He also did commentary on the GPS III Space Vehicle 05 mission in June 2021.

References 

1956 births
Living people
People from Detroit
American aerospace engineers
University of Michigan alumni
United States Air Force officers
SpaceX people